Cyperus chersinus is a species of sedge that is native to southern parts of Africa.

See also 
 List of Cyperus species

References 

chersinus
Plants described in 1936
Flora of South Africa
Flora of Botswana
Flora of Namibia
Flora of Mozambique
Flora of Zimbabwe
Taxa  named by Georg Kükenthal
Taxa named by N. E. Brown